Togetherness Supreme  is a 2010 Kenyan film.

Synopsis 
Based on actual events, Togetherness Supreme is the story of Kamau, an artist, searching for change in the midst of tribal tension in the slums. Kamau stands up against his father and his tribe to join a rival tribe with his friend Otieno. Kamau and Otieno fight for political change for those living in extreme poverty, but they are caught up in the middle of the ethnic conflict that tears apart their country and, furthermore, they are rivals for the love of Alice, a preacher's daughter. After a contested presidential election (Kenyan presidential election of December 2007), the slums erupt in violence and Kamau's world collapses around him.

Plot 
Togetherness Supreme was made in the aftermath of the 2007–2008 political, economic, and humanitarian crisis that break out after President Mwai Kibaki was re-elected in December 2007. This film dramatizes the post-election violence in Kibera, where police fired on demonstrators and rival groups fighting in the streets.

Results 
The film  had a positive effect on audiences in Kenya and internationally and it encouraged  Kenyans to see it as the 2012 elections approach. Different tribes were included in the film.  It helps to have a common project to work on. Working on a film is a lot of work but small in scale compared to working on the larger project of one's community and country. During the production of the film, the actors helped translate the script, which was written in English, to make their lines into their own tribal dialects. That had a harmonious effect because everyone practiced his and her own culture while also reaching out to others. The main goal in the film is to grow the concept, beyond Kibera, to other parts of Kenya and East Africa. To refine our model and spread it. To set a new mold for film education for the region that is more accessible to lower income communities. That looks for talent and ambition over resources as a pre-requisite. That uses the best of local knowledge and resources yet can also tap into international teachers and working professionals from the USA and Europe.

Awards 
 African Movie Academy Awards 2010: 2 awards
 Best International Feature Film – Santa Barbara International Film Festival 2011
 Global Landscape Award – Cinequest Film Festival 2011

References 

2010 films
Films set in Kenya
Kenyan drama films